The Eyalet of Kars was an eyalet (province) of the Ottoman Empire.

The town of Kars, which had been levelled to the ground by the Timur in 1368, was rebuilt as an Ottoman fortress in 1579 (1580 according to other sources) by Lala Mustafa Pasha, and became capital of an eyalet of six sanjaks and also a place of pilgrimage. It was conquered by Shah Abbas in 1604 and rebuilt by the Turks in 1616.

The size of the Kars garrison in 1640s was 1,002 Janissaries and 301 local recruits. Total 1,303 garrison.

Administrative divisions
Sanjaks of Kars Eyalet in the 17th century:
 Little Erdehan Sanjak (Göle)
 Hujujan Sanjak (Çıldır)
 Zarshad Sanjak (Arpaçay)
 Kechran Sanjak (Tunçkaya (Keçivan))
 Kaghizman Sanjak (Kağızman)
 Kars Sanjak, the seat of the Pasha

References

Eyalets of the Ottoman Empire in Anatolia
1604 disestablishments
History of Ardahan Province
History of Artvin Province
History of Kars Province
1580 establishments in the Ottoman Empire
1875 disestablishments in the Ottoman Empire